Miguel Lang-Lenton (born 13 January 1956) is a Spanish former butterfly swimmer who competed in the 1976 Summer Olympics.

References

1956 births
Living people
Spanish male butterfly swimmers
Olympic swimmers of Spain
Swimmers at the 1976 Summer Olympics